Malcolm  Alexander Murray (born March 1955) is a Scottish businessman and former Chairman of Rangers Football Club.

Early life

Murray was educated at Strathclyde University.

Business career
Murray's business career has mainly focussed on pension fund management, with him being involved in some of the largest funds in the UK, including Phillips and Drew. He also holds a senior independent director role with MWB Business Exchange PLC, having gained 31 years of experience in investment management prior to this.

Football

Manchester United F.C.

In the early 1990s, Murray purchased and had stewardship of a 25% shareholding in Manchester United.

Rangers F.C.

On 14 June 2012, following the financial difficulties of  Rangers and subsequent takeover by Charles Green's consortium, Murray was appointed as new chairman of the club. It was revealed that Murray is a lifelong fan of Rangers and a season ticket holder.

Murray survived several attempts to oust him as Rangers chairman before being replaced by former club manager, Walter Smith.

References

People from Ayrshire
Rangers F.C. chairmen
Rangers F.C. non-playing staff
Chairmen and investors of football clubs in Scotland
Alumni of the University of Strathclyde
English football chairmen and investors
1956 births
Living people